Ahmet Hakan Demirli (born 7 August 2000) is a Turkish football player who plays as a forward for Artvin Hopaspor on loan from Kasımpaşa.

Professional career
Demirli made his professional debut with Kasımpaşa in a 3-1 Turkish Cup loss to Alanyaspor on 15 January 2020.

References

External links
 
 
 Mackolik Profile

1999 births
People from Üsküdar
Footballers from Istanbul
Living people
Turkish footballers
Association football forwards
Kasımpaşa S.K. footballers
Süper Lig players
TFF Second League players
TFF Third League players